Stamped from the Beginning: The Definitive History of Racist Ideas in America is a non-fiction book about race in the United States by the American historian Ibram X. Kendi, published April 12, 2016 by Bold Type Books, an imprint of PublicAffairs. The book won the National Book Award for Nonfiction.

The book also has two "remixes" for children, Stamped: Racism, Antiracism, and You and Stamped (For Teens ): Racism, Antiracism, and You.

Reception
Stamped from the Beginning received a starred review from Kirkus, as well as the following accolades:

 National Book Award for Nonfiction winner (2016)
 National Book Critics Circle Award for General Nonfiction finalist (2016)
 Hurston/Wright Legacy Award for Nonfiction nominee (2017)
NAACP Image Award for Outstanding Literary Work – Nonfiction (2017)

Stamped: Racism, Antiracism, and You
Kendi wrote Stamped: Racism, Antiracism, and You with Jason Reynolds, "remixing" Stamped from the Beginning for a younger audience. The book was published March 10, 2020 by Little, Brown Books for Young Readers.

Origins
Stamped: Racism, Antiracism, and You is adapted from Stamped: From the Beginning, originally written by Kendi. The first book, published in 2016, focuses on historical figures. However, Stamped: Racism, Antiracism, and You follows a chronological format. Kendi reached out to Reynolds to collaborate on a chronological version after seeing success with his first book. Reynolds first declined Kendi's proposal, adamant that he was a fiction writer. It took a writing style that made Stamped "not a history book" to get Reynolds on board with the idea.

Structure

Kendi and Reynolds insist throughout the book that "it is not a history book" and writes in a casual, easy-to-understand manner, using slang and pop culture references to cater to the younger audience. There are five sections split by time periods: 1415–1728, 1743–1826, 1826–1879, 1868–1963, and 1963-today. The chapters vary in length and there are 28 in total. In these chapters, Kendi and Reynolds focus on important, often overlooked figures and events to illustrate the development of racist ideas throughout the history of the United States. Throughout the book, Kendi and Reynolds return to the themes of racists, assimilationists, and antiracists, and the book ends by encouraging readers to take what they have learned from the book and to become antiracist.

Reception 
Stamped is a New York Times Bestseller and received numerous positive reviews, including starred reviews from Booklist and Kirkus. Kirkus also named it one of the best books of 2020.

The print book has received the following accolades:

 Goodreads Choice Award for Nonfiction (2020)
 Booklist Editors' Choice: Books for Youth (2020)
 Kirkus Prize finalist (2020)
 Notable Children's Books (2021)
 NAACP Image Award for Outstanding Literary Work - Youth / Teens nomination

The audiobook has received the following accolades:

 American Library Association Top 10 Amazing Audiobooks for Young Adults (2017)
 Booklist Editors' Choice: Youth Audio (2020)
 Odyssey Award Honor Audiobook (2021)

Despite the above, in 2020, Stamped landed the second position on the American Library Association's list of the most commonly banned and challenged books in the United States. The book was banned, challenged, and/or restricted "because of author’s public statements, and because of claims that the book contains 'selective storytelling incidents' and does not encompass racism against all people."

Stamped (For Kids): Racism, Antiracism, and You 
Stamped (For Kids): Racism, Antiracism, and You, published May 11, 2021 by Little, Brown Young Readers. The book was written by Ibram X. Kendi and Jason Reynolds, illustrated by Rachelle Baker, and adapted by Sonja Cherry-Paul.

Stamped (for Kids) is a New York Times Bestseller and received a starred review from Kirkus.

References

External links
 Interview at New Books Network
 Interview at Slate 
Interview with Kendi on Stamped from the Beginning at the Tucson Festival of Books, March 11, 2017, C-SPAN
Interview with Kendi on Stamped from the Beginning at Printers Row Lit Fest, June 10, 2017, C-SPAN
Interview with Kendi on Stamped from the Beginning at the Busboys and Poets Bookstore, August 29, 2017, C-SPAN

2016 non-fiction books
English-language books
Anti-racism in the United States
Books about race and ethnicity
Books by Ibram X. Kendi